Chomaqestan may refer to:
 Chomaqestan, Amlash
 Chomaqestan, Rudsar